Toquop Wash is a stream in Clark County, and Lincoln County, Nevada.

References

Rivers of Clark County, Nevada
Rivers of Lincoln County, Nevada
Rivers of Nevada